is a Japanese former professional baseball pitcher in Japan's Nippon Professional Baseball. He played for the Tohoku Rakuten Golden Eagles from 2014 to 2019.

References

External links

NPB stats

1991 births
Living people
Baseball people from Ibaraki Prefecture
Japanese baseball players
Nippon Professional Baseball pitchers
Tohoku Rakuten Golden Eagles players